Salvador Martínez Surroca (8 February 1901 - 21 August 1974) was a Spanish footballer who played as a defender for FC Barcelona.

Club career
Born in the Region of Murcia, he moved to Sant Just Desvern when he was still a child. Surroca began his career with FC Barcelona in 1920, being a member of a legendary Barcelona team, coached by Jack Greenwell, that also included Paulino Alcántara, Sagibarba, Ricardo Zamora and Josep Samitier. During his time at the club he helped them win three Championat de Catalunya titles (1921–22, 1923–24 and 1925–26) and three Copa del Rey (1922, 1925 and 1926). Because of the existence of his teammate Vicente Martínez, he become known in the football world by his last name, Surroca, from a very early age, which was very uncommon among the Catalans.

He occupied the defensive position, where he stood out for his forcefulness, of which he gave plenty of evidence, for example, during the 1922 Copa del Rey Final held on 14 May 1922 at Campo de Coia, in which with six minutes left in the game, Surroca brought down Real Unión player Patricio in the area, prompting a monumental brawl, which including a field invasion, with the match being suspended for more than twenty minutes, causing a great scandal. In the end, Barça prevailed with a resounding 5–1 victory.

In 1926 he joined FC Lleida and in 1927 CE Manresa. In 1929 Surroca won a position as a teacher and moved to the town of El Talladell, in the province of Lleida. There he combined his teaching work with the practice of amateur football in the team of FC Tàrrega, playing with them for three years between 1929 and 1932. During this last campaign, he won the Lleida provincial championship.

International career
Like many other FC Barcelona players of that time, Surroca played several matches for the Catalonia national team, and he was part of the team that won the 1923–24 Prince of Asturias Cup, an inter-regional competition organized by the RFEF. Surroca started in the final against a Madrid XI and conceded 4 goals in a 4–4 draw, which cost him his place to the team's backup defender, Joaquín Montané, who started in the second leg as Catalonia won 3–2, thus lifting the trophy for the third time in the team's history.

Honours

Club
Barcelona
Catalan Championships:
Winners (4) 1920–21, 1921–22, 1923–24 and 1925–26

Copa del Rey:
Winners (3) 1922, 1925 and 1926

International
Catalonia
Prince of Asturias Cup:
Champions (1): 1923–24

References

1901 births
1974 deaths
Footballers from the Region of Murcia
Spanish footballers
Association football defenders
FC Barcelona players
Lleida Esportiu footballers
CE Manresa players
UE Tàrrega players
Catalonia international footballers